The Interior Mountains or Northern Interior Mountains are the semi-official names for an expansive collection of mountain ranges that comprises much of the northern half of the Canadian province of British Columbia and a large area of southern Yukon.  

There are four main groupings, the Skeena, Cassiar and Omineca Mountains to the north of the Interior Plateau between the Coast Mountains to the west and the Rocky Mountains to the east, and the Hazelton Mountains along the Interior Plateau's northwestern flank against the Coast Mountains, extending from the Bulkley Ranges south to the Bella Coola River.  Included within the Interior Mountains system is the Stikine Plateau, which contains a number of sub-plateaus and various mountain ranges and is located west of the Cassiars, north of the Skeenas, and to the east of the Boundary Ranges of the Coast Mountains. 

Most of the thousands of summits in the Interior Mountains are unnamed, and they are mostly uninhabited and undeveloped.

Etymology
The terms Interior Mountains and Northern Interior Mountains were coined by British Columbia government geographer Stuart Holland in the course of writing his Landforms of British Columbia, which is a definitive volume on the province's topography and toponymy written in 1964. This work is used as the basis for official toponymies such as those in the provincial gazette and the British Columbia Geographic Names Information System Database (BCGNIS), which is the official registry of the province's geographic names.

The term Interior Mountains, used by Holland throughout his work and as a chapter heading describing the mountain system in question, is not present in the Geographical Names Database despite being a chapter heading and appearing on Holland's map of the province's landform systems. He suggests, also, the term "Northern Interior Mountains", partly because the mountain system is in a region also known as the Northern Interior, but also to potentially distinguish this mountain system from mountain ranges farther south in the province's Interior, including those of the Interior Plateau. In his exegesis, he decided on "Interior Mountains" for reasons of brevity.

Component ranges and plateaus
Major mountain ranges and plateaus that are considered part of the Interior Mountains are included.

Cassiar Mountains
 Dease Plateau
 Kechika Ranges
 Sifton Ranges
 Stikine Ranges

Hazelton Mountains
 Bulkley Ranges
 Kispiox Range
 Nass Ranges
 Pattullo Range
 Tahtsa Ranges

Omineca Mountains
 Finlay Ranges
 Hogem Ranges
 Metsantan Range
 Samuel Black Range
 Swannell Ranges
 Tatlatui Range

Skeena Mountains
 Atna Range
 Babine Range
 Bait Range
 Driftwood Range
 Klappan Range
 Oweegee Range
 Sicintine Range
 Slamgeesh Range
 Strata Range
 Takla Range

Stikine Plateau
 Kawdy Plateau
 Nahlin Plateau
 Spatsizi Plateau
 Tagish Highland (NB sometimes defined as part of the Coast Mountains)
 Tahltan Highland (NB sometimes defined as part of the Coast Mountains)
 Taku Plateau (NB sometimes defined as part of the Yukon Plateau)
 Tanzilla Plateau

Parks and protected areas
Boya Lake Provincial Park
Dall River Old Growth Provincial Park
Denetiah Provincial Park
Dune Za Keyih Provincial Park and Protected Area
Horneline Creek Provincial Park
Hyland River Provincial Park
Kinaskan Lake Provincial Park
Mount Edziza Provincial Park and Recreation Area
Rainbow Alley Provincial Park
Spatsizi Plateau Wilderness Provincial Park
Stikine River Provincial Park
Todagin South Slope Provincial Park
Tuya Mountains Provincial Park

Proposed protected areas
Sacred Headwaters

See also
Interior Plateau

References
S. Holland, Landforms of British Columbia, Province of British Columbia, 1976

 
Northern Interior of British Columbia
Mountain ranges of British Columbia
Mountain ranges of Yukon